George Orde Bigge  (13 January 1869 – 26 March 1935) was an English first-class cricketer and British Army officer. Bigge served with the Royal Engineers from 1887 to 1920, seeing action in both the Second Boer War and the First World War. He also played first-class cricket for the Marylebone Cricket Club.

Life and military career
The son of Major Thomas Scovell Charles Bigge and his wife, Ellen Bigge, he was born at Ferozepore in British India. He graduated from the Royal Military Academy in July 1887, entering into the Royal Engineers as a second lieutenant. He was promoted to the rank of lieutenant in July 1890, with promotion to the rank of captain in April 1898. Bigge made a single appearance in first-class cricket for the Marylebone Cricket Club (MCC) against Derbyshire at Lord's in June 1898. Batting twice in the match, he was dismissed in the MCC first-innings for 11 runs by George Davidson, while in their second-innings he was dismissed by the same bowler for a single run. He also made his debut in minor counties cricket for Hertfordshire in July 1898. He played minor counties cricket for Hertfordshire until 1903, making eleven appearances.

He served during the Second Boer War and was decorated with the Queen's South Africa Medal. He was promoted to the rank of major in February 1906. After serving in the First World War, he held the rank of lieutenant colonel by October 1919. In December 1919 he was made an OBE, before retiring from active service in June 1920. He died in March 1935 at Stone in Oxney, Kent. He was survived by his wife, Eliza Augusta Bigge, whom he had married at Rye in 1906. His brother-in-law, Henry Braybrooke, was also a first-class cricketer.

References

External links

1869 births
1935 deaths
Sportspeople from Firozpur
Graduates of the Royal Military Academy, Woolwich
Royal Engineers officers
English cricketers
Marylebone Cricket Club cricketers
Hertfordshire cricketers
British Army personnel of the Second Boer War
British Army personnel of World War I
Officers of the Order of the British Empire